The Naukhanda palace is a royal palace of the Nizams located in Aurangabad, Maharashtra, India.

History
The palace was built by Malik Ambar in 1616 upon the summit of a rising ground at Aurangabad, India. The massive portal gateway leading to this, over which the Naubatkhana sounded, was called Barkal. According to one account a noble of Aurangzeb’s court named Alam Khan, made additions to this Palace; and further additions were subsequently made by Asaf Jah I. An adjoining block of buildings was screened off by a partition wall for Nasir Jang. The Naukonda palace was also occupied by Nizam Ali Khan, when he was at Aurangabad.

Layout
The palace had nine apartments, the interior buildings consisted of five zananas, a Divan i Aam, a Divan i Khas, a masjid and a kacheri, each provided with a garden and a cistern. The walls of the central part of the Devankhana, and a hamam or hot bath attached to the building, are in a fair state of preservation. However, the wood-work and the stucco plaster are all gone. The Divan i Aam is a large quadrangular structure much in ruins. The Kacheri close by contains a gadi of the Nizam. In the throne room are placed the original paraphernalia.

The Diwan e Aam was demolished when the present medical college of Aurangabad was constructed. The palace now houses The Aurangabad College for women.
In the olden days Nawab Salar Jang's palace and Govind Baksh's mahal were between the Paitan and Jafar gates.

It is presently owned by Prince Azmat Jah Bahadur.

References
Gazetter of Aurangabad - H. H. The Nizam's Government 1884. (Chapter XI page 805 - 877)

External links
Maharashtra Govt.Website

Tourist attractions in Aurangabad, Maharashtra
Palaces in Maharashtra
Buildings and structures in Aurangabad, Maharashtra
Palaces of Nizams of Hyderabad